Ilhéu de Baluarte is a small uninhabited islet of the Cape Verde archipelago located  off the northeastern coast of the island of Boa Vista. It is the easternmost land mass of Cape Verde. The islet and its surrounding marine area forms the protected area Reserva Natural Integral Ilhéu de Baluarte. Its highest point is less than five meters; it is a flat and rocky isle made up of basaltic rocks. It became an integral protected natural area in 1990, visits can only be done by the permission of local authorities.

Notes

Uninhabited islands of Cape Verde
Protected areas of Cape Verde
Geography of Boa Vista, Cape Verde